Luke Strong may refer to:

 Luke Strong (Coronation Street), a character in the British television soap opera Coronation Street
 Luke Strong (gymnast) (born 1993), British trampoline gymnast